Goodbye Leonard (French: Adieu Léonard) is a 1943 French comedy film directed by Pierre Prévert and starring Charles Trenet, Pierre Brasseur and Julien Carette. The future star Simone Signoret had a small role in the film.

The film's sets were designed by the art director Max Douy. It was shot at the Francoeur Studios in Paris. It was distributed by Pathé, one of France's largest film companies.

Partial cast
 Charles Trenet as Ludovic Malvoisin - un doux poète  
 Pierre Brasseur as Prosper Bonenfant - un affairiste véreux  
 Julien Carette as Félicien Léonard - un fabricant de farces et attrapes ruiné  
 Denise Grey as Bernardine Léonard - la femme insupportable et dépensière de Félicien  
 Jean Meyer as Eugène Tancrède - un poète 
 Jacqueline Pagnol as Paulette - une serveuse qui aime Ludovic  
 Gaby Wagner as Marguerite, la jolie voyageuse  
 Marcel Pérès as Le patron du café 'La Confiance'  
 Albert Rémy as Le marchand d'oiseaux  
 Jeanne Arnoux 
 Roger Blin as Le chef bohémien  
 René Bourbon as Maître Failtrain - le notaire  
 Jenny Burnay as Geneviève Bonenfant - la femme de Prosper 
 Jean Dasté as Le raccommodeur de porcelaine 
 Guy Decomble as Le rémouleur  
 Etienne Decroux as Prasmoquier  
 Jean Didier as Le voyageur dans le train  
 Louise Fouquet as La bouquetière  
 Yette Lucas as La patronne du café 'La Confiance'  
 Madeleine Suffel as La poule  
 Edmond Van Daële as Le graveur  
 Yves Deniaud as Léon - le garçon de café  
 Maurice Baquet as Le marchand de lampions  
 Édouard Delmont as Le chemineau 
 Simone Signoret as La gitane
 Geneviève Morel as La bonne

References

Bibliography 
 Hayward, Susan. Simone Signoret: The Star as Cultural Sign. A&C Black, 2004.

External links 
 

1943 films
French comedy films
1943 comedy films
1940s French-language films
Films directed by Pierre Prévert
French black-and-white films
Films scored by Joseph Kosma
Films shot at Francoeur Studios
1940s French films